Sar Asiab-e Farsangi or Sar Asiab Farsangi or Sar Asiyab Farsangi may refer to:
 Sar Asiab-e Farsangi, Derakhtengan
 Sar Asiab-e Farsangi Rural District